William Alcliffe was the member of the Parliament of England for Marlborough for the parliament of April 1414.

References 

Members of Parliament for Marlborough
Year of birth unknown
Year of death unknown
English MPs April 1414